Two ships of the Royal Navy have been named HMS Salvia:

, an 
, a 

Royal Navy ship names